Chicken Girls: The Movie is a 2018 film based on the Brat show Chicken Girls. The film was directed by Asher Levin and written by Janey Feingold, and stars Annie LeBlanc, Hayden Summerall, Brooke Butler, Carson Lueders, Indiana Massara, Aliyah Moulden, Grayson Thorne Kilpatrick, Adrian R'Mante, and Rush Holland. The movie premiered on June 29, 2018.

Plot

The film is a teen musical about a group of middle school dancers. 
The film opens in Paris, with Rhyme and TK on a date. Rhyme comments on how she wishes she could stay there forever. It turns out, however, that this is two different actors rehearsing a scene in a movie, directed by TK and Flash. Despite protests from the actors, TK insists that they do the take again, as it has to be perfect.

Rhyme, Ellie, Kayla, and Quinn are talking about their chances of performing at the Spring Fling while walking to school. The conversation then turns into who they will ask to the dance. While Ellie insists she is going alone, Rhyme talks about how she wants to go with TK. The school then performs "Dancing on the Ceiling". They are interrupted by Principal Anthony, who says that they are not allowed to sing in the hallways, to which Ellie finds strange, as she always sings in the hallway.

Rhyme, Ellie, Kayla, and Birdie discuss Principal Anthony, until Luna and Monica walk up to them. Luna claims that Power Surge will crush Attaway Dance Team at the tryouts and get dates to the dance before them. She says that she always thought TK was cute, angering Birdie, who tells her to stay away from her brother. The conversation ends as Senõr Singer prepares to start class. Sheldon, a student who is fond of principal Anthony, leaves the classroom and tells her that everyone is talking about the dance, and no one seems concerned about academics.

While hanging out with Flash and Ace, TK asks if they can do a reshoot on the movie. Ace is confused why they aren’t done with the movie yet and tells Flash that his basketball skills will get rusty. Flash remarks that you have to make sacrifices for art. They two soon get into a fight. TK plays peace maker, saying that this is why they haven't been asked to the dance. Ace and Flash tell TK to chill out, as they are fine and we’re just joking, with Ace reminding TK that he has not been asked to the dance either.

Ellie arrives at the library, where she takes notice of a guy named Davis. She puts headphones on and sings, only to be stopped by Davis, who is trying to study. When he starts complementing her, Ellie tells him to back off, as she believes he is trying to get her to ask him to the Spring Fling. This is not Davis’ intention however, as he doesn't want to go to the dance. This makes Ellie feel better, and Davis proceeds to help her with polynomials. Also in the library, Flash raves about TK's movie to Rhyme, and complements TK's direction, before asking Kayla who she will attend the Spring Fling with. Kayla explains that she has some people in mind, and tells Flash to text her. She asks TK if Flash is going to the dance with anyone, to which TK answers that no one has asked him yet.

Quinn and Rooney argue about their parents, with Birdie in tow, who remarks that even though they are step sisters, they fight like blood relatives.

Senõr Singer holds auditions for who will perform at the dance. After a failed attempt by Hamilton, Ace performs, but he is stopped when he and one of the girls get too close for comfort. Attaway Dance Team goes to audition, and they are joined by Power Surge on the stage. The two teams have a dance battle.

Sheldon Questions if TK and Flash are allowed to video tape at the school. He tells them to follow him.

Senõr Singer declares that Attaway Dance Team and Power Surge will perform together. This angers Birdie and Luna. The two teams storm to the Principal's office. Rhyme sees TK and asks why he is there, to which he responds that he doesn't know. The dance teams talk to Principal Anthony, but she tells all the students that they must put academics first and that skirts must go down to the knee, annoying Rooney. Birdie decides to ask Tim to help her study, to which he agrees to.

Rhyme meets up with TK, who is working on the movie. He explains that everything has to be perfect. They spend the rest of the day together.

The next day, Principal Anthony invites Senõr Singer over for dinner to discuss limiting the performance arts program, unaware that Rhyme is listening. Senõr Singer declines, stating that they have passion, something that she lacks. Principal Anthony realizes that it is worse than she thought, in the library, no one is studying.

Mr. Forrester picks up Rooney and Quinn for school, as Birdie and Tim finish up their study session. They make plans for the next day.

Flash and Ace throw a football. Flash explains that Kayla texted him and that he didn't know what to say. Ace tells Flash that has a lot to learn.

Tim notices Principal Anthony and Sheldon planning something.

The Chicken Girls discuss who they are thinking about taking to the dance.  Ellie finds out that Principal Anthony has cancelled the Spring Fling. In its place, she has instituted the Test Test, a Practice Exam for state.

A montage then occurs of the school studying for the Test Test. Ellie starts making math jokes, Kayla insists that they get the test over with, and Quinn says that its not so bad, as she had no one to go to the dance with anyway. Rhyme asks them if they've heard themselves, and declares that the new principal is ruining their lives. Rhyme angrily leaves the group, where she is stopped by Luna, who encourages her to be a leader for her friends and take a stand.

Ace tells Flash that he will text Kayla from Flash's phone, so that Flash will sounds cool. Kayla responds, saying that Flash sounds like two different people. TK invites Rhyme for a study date.

Rooney and Quinn overhear their parents fighting. Quinn worries that their parents will split. Rooney interrupts and says she has to leave, as she is hanging out with Hamilton.

TK talks to Dru about Rhyme.

Rhyme tells Harmony about her troubles. Harmony discovers that Principal Anthony has a crush on Senõr Singer. She then devises a plan to save the spring fling, recruiting Rooney (someone who can see what we can't), Ace (someone fluent in the language of love), and Luna (an unsuspecting ally). Rooney tells the group that one a week Senõr Singer visits his grandma.

The plan is set into motion. Rhyme gives Principal Anthony cashmere, Ace asks Senõr Singer about Principal Anthony, and Luna tells Sheldon that Rhyme has been ditching class to go the home for the elderly. Ellie arrives to check up on Rhyme, but Rhyme rebuffs her.

Principal Anthony and Sheldon go to the home of the elderly, where Ace is performing. Rhyme and Rooney speak to an elderly couple, who say that they had a crush on each other for a while, reminding Rhyme of her relationship with TK. Luna is disguised as an old lady, but she falls and says that she wishes she could have one last dance. Principal Anthony decides that the dance is back on, but only if they pass the Test Test. Rhyme realizes she missed her study date with TK, who is working on his movie.

Birdie and Tim study together, Kayla texts Flash, who is told by Ace not to respond. Rooney invites Quinn to study with her and Hamilton, but is rebuffed. Ellie and Davis work together as well. Kayla tells Flash that her thinking of asking him was a mistake. Hamilton tells Rooney to ask him to the dance who says she has to ask someone else first. Rhyme apologizes to TK for missing their study date. She asks him to meet him after the Test Test.

The Test Test begins, and the students get their scores back. Ellie is excited that she did well. Everyone passes except Rhyme, who failed because she did not study. She blames Harmony, because their scheme distracted her. Rhyme sings as everyone gets ready for the dance. Rooney and Quinn learn that their parents are not getting a divorce, to which both girls are relieved.

Ellie, Kayla, and Quinn arrive at Rhyme's house. They sing “Birds of a Feather”. She apologizes for being a jerk, but they devise a way to let her attend the dance.

The dance kicks off. Ellie dances with Davis, Birdie dances with Tim, Rooney invites Hamilton to dance with both her and Quinn. Flash ignores Ace's advice and comes clean about the texts. They then dance too. Luna asks Ace to have a friendly dance with her.

TK dances with Dru. TK explains that he can't find Rhyme. He then leaves when he finds out she couldn't attend. Attaway and Power Surge reconcile, and Rhyme arrives in a chicken suit. Rhyme agrees to study extra hard if she is allowed to dance. Principal Anthony agrees. Attaway and Power Surge perform together.

Rhyme arrives home and apologizes to Harmony, who tells her to go outside. TK is waiting for her, and he shows her the film, which is really about the two of them. He tells her that he is going away for the whole summer with Flash. After she leaves, he tells her to wait, and they kiss.

Cast
 Juliana Grace LeBlanc as Rhyme
 Hayden Summerall as TK
 Brooke Elizabeth Butler as Ellie
 Carson Lueders as Ace
 Indiana Massara as Rooney
 Aliyah Moulden as Luna
 Grayson Thorne Kilpatrick as Sheldon
 Adrian R'Mante as Señor Singer
 Melanie Paxson as Principal Anthony
 Rush Holland as Flash
 Hayley LeBlanc as Harmony McAdams
 Dylan Conrique as Kayla Sharp
 Riley Lewis as Quinn Forrester
 Madison Lewis as Birdie Kaye
 Caden Conrique as Tim
 Jeremiah Perkins as Hamilton
 Jenna Davis as Monica
 Billy LeBlanc as Mr. Forrester
 Rebecca Zamolo as Mrs. Forrester
 Kelsey Leon as Kimmie
 Erin Reese Delanette as Bess
 Talin Silva as Jade
 Jaden Martin as Davis

Production
The premiere took place on June 28, 2018 at Ahrya Fine Arts Theatre in Beverly Hills, California. The film was released online through the Brat channel on June 29, 2018.

Music
"Dancing on the Ceiling", performed by Jules LeBlanc and the cast of Chicken Girls, was released as single on May 29, 2018, along with its music video. The song served as the opening number for the film. During the scene with Rhyme, Rooney, Ace, and Luna carrying out Operation Tango, the song "Feels Good" by Carson Lueders was used. After the Test Test, Rhyme sang a cover of "Stay" by Lisa Loeb. "Party Favor" by Cali Rodi was also used as the song for the final dance number in the movie. At the end of the movie, when TK and Rhyme kissed, as well as in the movie's outro, the song "Smiles For You" by Hayden Summerall was used. Carson Lueders also performed a song in this movie that was never released outside of the movie.

Reception
It received 2 million viewers in its first day and hit 10 million views on July 17, 2018. The film did not get much attention from Hollywood upon release. It received a mixed to negative review from Decider who praised Butler's performance saying "Butler really sells the character" but criticised the "hammy dialogue" and "poor-quality musical aspects". It hit 25 million views on January 28, 2020. The movie is the most popular program to ever be released on Brat, as it stands at over 34 million views (as of March 9, 2021).

References

External links
 
 

American teen musical films
Films based on web series
American teen comedy films
2018 films
Streaming television in the United States
Brat (digital network)
2010s teen comedy films
2010s musical comedy films
2010s English-language films
2010s American films